La Dame de Monsoreau is a historical novel by Alexandre Dumas, père published in 1846. It owes its name to the counts who owned the famous château de Montsoreau. The novel is concerned with fraternal royal strife at the court of Henri III. Tragically caught between the millstones of history are the gallant Count de Bussy and the woman he adores, la Dame de Monsoreau. Chicot the Jester is a character in the novel, and in some English translations he is the title character.

External links

 

1846 French novels
French novels adapted into films
Novels set in France
Novels set in the 16th century
Novels by Alexandre Dumas
Articles containing video clips
Cultural depictions of Henry III of France